Chilotomus is a genus of beetles in the family Carabidae, containing the following species:

 Chilotomus alexandri Kalashyan, 1999
 Chilotomus arnoldii Kryzhanovskij, 1962
 Chilotomus chalybaeus Faldermann, 1836
 Chilotomus kuhitangi Kryzhanovskij, 1962
 Chilotomus margianus Kryzhanovskij, 1962
 Chilotomus tschitscherini Sememov, 1903
 Chilotomus usgentensis Schauberger, 1932
 Chilotomus violaceus Kryzhanovskij & Mikhailov, 1971

References

Harpalinae